Sankt Georgen am Reith is a town in the district of Amstetten in Lower Austria in Austria.

Geography
St. Georgen am Reith lies in the Mostviertel in Lower Austria, on a branch of the river Ybbs. About 77 percent of the municipality is forested. The town has two churches, one Catholic and one Protestant, the town hall and an inn.

References

Cities and towns in Amstetten District